Grace Van Patten (born November 21, 1996) is an American actress. She has appeared in two films distributed by Netflix: Tramps (2016) and The Meyerowitz Stories (2017), and in Hulu's miniseries Nine Perfect Strangers (2021) and Tell Me Lies (2022). She is the daughter of director Timothy Van Patten and niece of actors Joyce Van Patten and Dick Van Patten.

Early life

Van Patten grew up in Tribeca, New York City, and attended Fiorello H. LaGuardia High School. She is the eldest of three daughters of director and producer Timothy Van Patten and former model Wendy Rossmeyer Van Patten. Grace Van Patten was a self-described "tomboy" and played volleyball and basketball. She owned a mini chopper motorcycle at a young age; her grandfather, Bruce Rossmeyer, had owned several Harley-Davidson dealerships that are now run by her mother. She is the niece of comic actor Dick Van Patten, and she lives with her family in Cobble Hill, Brooklyn. Her cousin is actress Talia Balsam, who is the daughter of Joyce Van Patten.

Career
At the age of 8, Van Patten's first role was on the crime drama television series The Sopranos, for which her father directed. He got her the audition, and she portrayed Ally, the daughter of a gangster Eugene Pontecorvo. She was in a 2014 episode of another series directed by her father, Boardwalk Empire. She deferred admission to the University of Southern California, instead choosing to audition in New York City and take community college classes in psychology and philosophy. She postponed the courses, however, when she got a job during the school year. She met her manager, Emily Gerson Saines, through LaGuardia classmate and actor Ansel Elgort.

Van Patten played Ellie in her first feature film, the Netflix romantic comedy Tramps, which premiered at the 2016 Toronto International Film Festival. She had a small part in crime drama Stealing Cars and starred in the 2017 horror thriller Central Park. In the comedy-drama film The Meyerowitz Stories (New and Selected), Van Patten portrayed Eliza, a Bard College film student and the daughter of Adam Sandler's character, Danny. In the film, directed by Noah Baumbach and screened at the 2017 Cannes Film Festival, Eliza makes sexually explicit shorts starring herself.

In her theater debut, Van Patten performed in The New Group's Off-Broadway play The Whirligig by Hamish Linklater alongside Zosia Mamet at the Pershing Square Signature Center. Van Patten acted in the 2017 romantic comedy The Wilde Wedding with Glenn Close, John Malkovich, Patrick Stewart, and Minnie Driver. Principal photography of Dolly Wells' Good Posture, starring Van Patten and Emily Mortimer, finished in Brooklyn in late December 2017.

She appeared in David Robert Mitchell's crime noir Under the Silver Lake with Mamet, Riley Keough, and Andrew Garfield. Van Patten was named one of Variety magazine's "10 Actors to Watch" in 2017.  In the fall of 2018, she appeared as Joan of Arc opposite Glenn Close in The Public Theater's production of Mother of the Maid. She will also star opposite Jovan Adepo in Kerem Sanga's drama The Violent Heart.

Acting credits

Film

Television

Stage

References

External links
 

Actresses from New York City
21st-century American actresses
American film actresses
American television actresses
Living people
People from Cobble Hill, Brooklyn
Van Patten family
1996 births